In engineering, a boss is a protruding feature on a work piece. A common use for a boss is to locate one object within a pocket or hole of another object. For instance, some motors use a precisely machined boss on the front face to locate it on the mating part. Like a process on a bone, bosses on castings can provide attachment points or bearing surfaces.

The term 'boss' when used in engineering can also relate to a finishing edge around (usually) a circular opening that allows the opening to locate onto, or within another opening thus locating or joining two items together with a view to the location or joining being temporary or semi-permanent.
A common everyday example of a boss is the housing of the rotation spindle in a washing machine drum, or on a cylinder lawn mower at the end of the cutting blade cylinder which may house a bearing set to allow the cylinder to rotate through one plane, but held firm in another plane.

A boss can also be a brass eyelet on a sail. It is a generic term to describe an item designed to facilitate the use with, within, on or around another item whereby one cannot operate properly without the other.

The word 'boss' is also often used to describe the end of a shaft on a boat to which a propeller might attach.

A boss may also refer to a mounting feature that will receive a screw or thread-forming screw.

In computer-aided design applications, a boss is a feature used to describe a type of extrusion.

The word boss comes from the Middle French word , which means protuberance.

See also 
 Docking sleeve
 Draft
 Fillet

References

Metalworking terminology